Municipality of Escuinapa is a municipality in Sinaloa in northwestern Mexico. The seat is Escuinapa de Hidalgo.

External links

References

Municipalities of Sinaloa